BrainBounce! was produced by Megafun Productions and aired on TV Ontario from 2001 to 2004. It currently airs on Discovery Kids in the UK. The series was shot in Montreal and Toronto as a "piggyback" production: the original French version, Le Monde a la Loupe (hosted by Stéphanie Allaire) was shot at the same time in each location.

Each episode begins in an "ordinary" place - a camp site, a dance studio, a movie theatre - and jumps into one fantasy world after another as more questions are discovered. Some have described the show as "stream-of-consciousness" or "encyclopedia" television. Subjects such as art, music, science, animals, the human body are explored by way of sketches, interviews with guest experts, experiments and mini-documentaries.

Content 
Julie Zwillich plays herself as the main host of the show, and also plays most of the characters who appear in her "brainbounces". Zwillich also wrote the lyrics for and sings the theme song at the beginning of the show.

Characters 
Elsa Fullbrain
Pabla Picante
Salvador Dalí (voice)
Giant Stick of Gum
Barry Metric
Pain (Cavity)
Scott McScotia
Connie Contatious
Cow (voice)
Chanel the Skunk (voice)
Farm Dog (voice)
Silent FIlm Starlet
Kathleen Kleen
Bedouin
Alien (voice)

Episodes 
The Cemetery
The Street Busker
The Cinema
The Cliff
The Pool
The Apartment
The Farm
The Video Store
The Dance Class
The Shopping Center
The Dentist
The Supermarket
The Campsite

External links 
Brainbounce! on TV Ontario's website
Brainbounce! poster on Julie Zwillich's website
Brainbounce! on Telefilm's website

2000s Canadian children's television series
TVO original programming
2001 Canadian television series debuts
2004 Canadian television series endings